Ankahee may refer to:

 Ankahee (1985 film), a 1985 Indian Hindi film
 Ankahee (2006 film), an Indian film directed by Vikram Bhatt